ABC Charleston may refer to:

WCIV in Charleston, South Carolina 
WCHS-TV in Charleston, West Virginia